Gachsaran County is in Kohgiluyeh and Boyer-Ahmad province, Iran. The capital of the county is the city of Dogonbadan. At the 2006 census, the county's population was 131,628 in 28,551 households. The following census in 2011 counted 119,217 people in 30,399 households, by which time Basht District had been separated from the county to form Basht County. At the 2016 census, the county's population was 124,096 in 34,329 households.

This county is known as Iran's oil roof because of the highest oil tower located in this county (Seghalatoun, 3221 feet above sea level) one of the most important and richest areas but more unknown in Iran because of its oil and gas products and it has the second largest (Ahvaz has the first) oil fields of Iran in this county. This county is one of the main heart of energy resources in the world. More than one-quarter of the oil of Iran is exported to all over the world from this county..  This Country is one of the special economic zones of Iran

History of capital
This city was named Gonbade malghan or Gonbade maljan in the past and now Dogonbadan and Gachsaran. There were two domes, one to the west and one to the east of the city, so the city was called Do gonbadan "between two domes". The city was rebuilt by British staff of the Darcy oil company about 1927.
It is reported that this area was also populated with some British residents who owned houses and vast lands not far from the outskirts of the city.

Administrative divisions

The population history and structural changes of Gachsaran County's administrative divisions over three consecutive censuses are shown in the following table. The latest census shows one district, four rural districts, and one city.

Gachsaran Oil & Gas Production
The Gachsaran Oil & Gas producing company with a distinct geographical situation stretches over provinces of Kohgiluyeh and Boyer-Ahmad Province, Fars, Busher, Khuzistan and Isfahan. Total production from about 320 wells is 750,000 bd. The main wells have been drilled at reservoirs of Gach Saran, Bibi Hakimeh, Rag-e-Safid, Pazanan, Gulkhari, Binak, Chilingar, Nargesi, Garangan, Kilur Karim, Sulabedar, Siahmakan, Khaviz, Rudak,
Zaaeh, Chahr Bisheh and Kuh-e-kaki.

Out of these regions Gachsaran Reservoir with 500,000 bd and Siahmakan with 4000bd have the highest and lowest production rates respectively.

Gachsaran and Dogonbadan as names of a city are in fact referring to the same place, as the city has two names.

Economy
Gachsaran is an oil- and gas-producing area that has just started to expand and profits from its industrial capacity. Gachsaran has the largest gas reserves in Iran also has the largest recoverable oil field in Iran and third in the world and has good various medicinal plants, citrus and olive. This city has good weather in middle and end of winter also has nice mountains for climbing around the city so it is perfect destination for climbing in fall, winter and beginning of spring. This city has good water resources and there are two big dams near the city which export water to other cities.

Gallery

References

 

Counties of Kohgiluyeh and Boyer-Ahmad Province